Tropicarium Kolmården is a public aquarium and terrarium, situated outside Kolmården Wildlife Park, close to Bråviken and  from Norrköping town in Sweden.

History 
Founded by Stig Gustavsson in 1972 and called "Kolmården Terrarium", with snakes and birds on show. Stig Gustavsson died in 1988.  Kolmarden Terrarium was bought by Kalle Farkasdi (Kalle later founded the Tropicarium Budapest in Hungary) and his son Stefan Farkasdi in 1989.  The new owners changed the name to Kolmården Tropicarium, building a half million litre shark aquarium as the main attraction and greatly increasing the number of species in the exhibition.  The theme for Kolmården tropicarium is "A TREK THROUGH THE RAINFOREST TO THE SEA".

Exhibits

Shark aquarium 
It houses sand tiger, nurse sharks and various species of fish.

Seawater aquarium 
Eight aquariums ranging in capacity from 1,000 litres to 18,000 litres. A wide variety of seawater species are exhibited, including blacktip reef sharks, bamboo sharks, moray eels, giant grouper, stingrays, scorpion fish and seahorses. The aquarium also exhibits many species of corals, and many reef fish, such as clownfish.

Freshwater aquarium 
Eight aquariums ranging in capacity from 6,000 litres to 75,000 litres. These aquariums house argusfish, barbs, perch, scorpion fish, electric eels, pike, giant gourami, carp, labyrintiods, malawi cichlids, mbuna, mouthbreeders, moonfish, piranhas, giant botia, stingrays, South American cichlids, tanganyika cichlids, tiger barbs and neon tetras.

Biotope terrarium 

Modernisation began in 2002 through to 2013, all terrariums were replaced by biotope terrariums. Biotope terrariums are replicas of the primary animals' natural habitat, including plants, fish and animals. Tropicarium Kolmarden now has over 20 biotope terrariums containing a large variety of reptiles, amphibians and mammals.

Rainforest – Jungle 
There are two jungle areas housing new world primates:
Both these jungles have water features containing various species of fish and turtles.

African Savanna 

North American Swamp 
The exhibit simulates a tropical thunder storm every half-hour.

Species 
Tropicarium has at least 175 species of vertebrates, including mammals, birds, reptiles and amphibians.

Mammals 
Mammals are represented with carnivores and primates.

Carnivores 
Meerkat (Suricata suricatta)

Primates 
Common marmoset (Callithrix jacchus)
Cottontop tamarin (Saguinus oedipus)
Pygmy marmoset (Callithrix pygmaea)

Birds (Aves) 
Blue-and-yellow macaw (Ara ararauna)

Reptiles

Turtles and tortoises (Testudines) 
Alligator snapping turtle (Macrochelys temminckii)
Chinese softshell turtle (Pelodiscus sinensis)
Hilaire's side-necked turtle (Phrynops hilarii)
Red-eared slider (Trachemys scripta elegans)

Crocodiles and alligators (Crocodilia) 
American alligator (Alligator mississippiensis)

Snakes (Serpentia) 
Black mamba (Dendroaspis polylepis)
Boa constrictor
Boomslang (Dispholidus typus)
Cave dwelling snake (Elaphe taeniura ridleyi)
Common viper (Vipera berus). Only on exhibition during summertime.
Corn snake (Pantherophis guttatus)
Cottonmouth (Agkistrodon piscivorus)
Eastern diamondback rattlesnake (Crotalus adamanteus)
False water cobra (Hydrodynastes gigas)
Gabon viper (Bitis gabonica)
Green anaconda (Eunectes murinus)
Green tree python (Morelia viridis)
King cobra (Ophiophagus hannah)
Reticulated python (Python reticulatus)
Rhinoceros ratsnake (Rhynchophis boulengeri)
South American bushmaster (Lachesis muta)
Taipan (Oxyuranus scutellatus)
Timber rattlesnake (Crotalus horridus)

Lizards (Sauria) 
Chinese water dragon (Physignathus cocincinus)
Gila monster (Heloderma suspectum)
Green iguana (Iguana iguana)
Plumed basilisk (Basiliscus plumifrons)
Solomon Islands skink (Corucia zebrata)

Amphibians (Amphibia) 
Anthony's poison arrow frog (Epipedobates anthonyi)
Cane toad (Bufo marinus)
Common tree frog (Polypedates leucomystax)
Japanese fire belly newt (Cynops pyrrhogaster)
Cranwell's horned frog (Ceratophrys cranwelli)
Dyeing dart frog (Dendrobates tinctorius)
Green and black poison dart frog (Dendrobates auratus)
Oriental fire-bellied toad (Bombina orientalis)
Yellow-striped poison frog (Dendrobates truncatus)

Bony fish (Osteichthyes) 
Yellow and blueback fusilier (Caesio teres)
Bluestreak cleaner wrasse (Labroides dimidiatus)
Silver moony (Monodactylus argenteus)
Yellowtail clownfish (Amphiprion clarkii)
Blackwedged butterflyfish (Chaetodon falcula)

Cartilaginous fishes (Chondrichthyes) 

Atlantic nurse shark (Ginglymostoma cirratum)
Blacktip reef shark (Carcharhinus melanopterus)
Bluespotted ribbontail ray (Taeniura lymma)
Brownbanded bambooshark (Chiloscyllium punctatum)
Common stingray (Dasyatis pastinaca)
Giant shovelnose ray (Rhinobatus typus)
Sand tiger shark (Carcharias taurus)
Southern stingray (Dasyatis americana)

References

External links 

Buildings and structures in Östergötland County
Tourist attractions in Östergötland County
1972 establishments in Sweden
1989 establishments in Sweden
Zoos in Sweden
Tourist attractions in Sweden
Aquaria in Sweden
Water in Sweden
Zoos established in 1989